Sadio Doumbia and Fabien Reboul were the defending champions but chose not to defend their title.

Rafael Matos and Felipe Meligeni Alves won the title after defeating Gilbert Klier Júnior and Matheus Pucinelli de Almeida 6–3, 6–1 in the final.

Seeds

Draw

References

External links
 Main draw

Campeonato Internacional de Tênis de Campinas - Doubles
2021 Doubles